Koen van Damme (born ) is a Belgian male artistic gymnast, representing his nation at international competitions.  He participated at the 2008 Summer Olympics in Beijing, China.

References

1987 births
Living people
Belgian male artistic gymnasts
Place of birth missing (living people)
Gymnasts at the 2008 Summer Olympics
Olympic gymnasts of Belgium